Grom (Polish for "Thunder") is the second studio album by Polish extreme metal band Behemoth. It was recorded and mixed from December 1995 to January 1996 and was originally released in January 1996 through Solistitium Records, and later by Pagan Records. The album is Behemoth's last release before their shift into a death metal sound.

Critical reception 

AllMusic wrote of the album: "One of the most controversial and diverse albums in the band's career, the album is intriguing for several reasons: it not only featured keyboards and female vocals, but showed Behemoth's uniqueness from the start, with their novel combination of black, viking and thrash metal."

Track listing

Personnel

Release history

References 

Behemoth (band) albums
1996 albums
Polish-language albums
Albums produced by Adam Darski